Freedom Oklahoma is a statewide political advocacy organization in Oklahoma that advocates for lesbian, gay, bisexual, and transgender (LGBT) rights, including same-sex marriage.

History 
Freedom Oklahoma was formed in 2015 with the merger of Cimarron Alliance Equality Center and The Equality Network. Cimarron Alliance's executive director at the time of the merger, Troy Stevenson, became the executive director of the new organization.

Activities 
Freedom Oklahoma is organizing efforts to defeat legislations considered harmful to the state's LGBT community, and promote positive LGBT legislation. The organization also supports same-sex marriage.

The organization's Equality Run promotes the organization's work and raises funds to support the organization.

The organization is a member of the Equality Federation.

See also 

 LGBT rights in Oklahoma
 List of LGBT rights organizations
 Same-sex marriage in Oklahoma

References

External links 
 

2015 establishments in Oklahoma
Equality Federation
LGBT political advocacy groups in Oklahoma
Non-profit organizations based in Oklahoma
Organizations based in Oklahoma City
Organizations established in 2015